Jan-Louis la Grange (born ) is a South African rugby union player for the  in Super Rugby, the  in the Currie Cup and the  in the Rugby Challenge. His regular position is centre or wing.

References

External links
 itsrugby.co.uk profile

South African rugby union players
Living people
1997 births
Sportspeople from Paarl
Rugby union centres
Golden Lions players
Lions (United Rugby Championship) players
Griquas (rugby union) players
Rugby union players from the Western Cape